The Young Doctors is an Australian early-evening soap opera originally broadcast on the Nine Network and produced by the Reg Grundy Organisation, it aired from Monday, 8 November 1976 until Wednesday, 30 March 1983. 
 
The series is primarily set in the fictional Albert Memorial Hospital, as well as the restaurant/nightclub Bunny's Place, and is fundamentally concerned with the romances and relations between younger members of the hospital staff, rather than typical medical issues and procedures.

The program was shown in exported internationally including throughout North America and Canada and Europe including the United Kingdom, the Netherlands, France and Spain.

Series history
The series produced by the Grundy Organisation was created and devised by Alan Coleman with Reg Watson acting as Executive Producer.

Watson had been the Producer of the British TV soap opera Crossroads from 1964 to 1973 and he moved back to Australia to help set up a new drama department within the Reg Grundy Organisation, which at the time, was better known for its game and quiz shows. With Coleman producing, as well as Watson's experience of making fast-turnaround, 5-days a week serial drama, The Young Doctors became the third soap opera produced by the Reg Grundy Organisation following the Seven Network's serials 'Class of 74 / 75 , and Until Tomorrow, which screened briefly in 1975.The Young Doctors began in November 1976, a week earlier than another new soap opera on Network Nine, The Sullivans, which was produced by Crawford Productions. The Nine Network made it clear only one of the series would be commissioned beyond the initial 13-week production run (approximately 65 episodes).The Sullivans, which had a 3 times greater budget, after the trial period emerged as the critical success, so The Young Doctors was cancelled.

Fans however lobbied the Nine Network, who then reversed their decision and by popular demand The Young Doctors continued in its daily 6.00 pm slot and had a successful run of six and a half years, making it one of Australia's longest running and popular serials of the time.

Later years
The Young Doctors long-serving cast members began to leave, so during the final season in 1982–83, many new characters were added in an attempt to modernise and refresh the long-running serial.

Producer and co-creator Alan Coleman also left in early 1982, and was replaced by Sue Masters twelve months before the series finished production in late November 1982. Masters went on to produce Grundy's replacement medical soap, Starting Out, for Nine, and then Grundy's stablemate, Prisoner, from 1983.

Several cast members after the series ended production went on to have leading roles in cult series Prisoner  including Judy McBurney, Genevieve Lemon, Babs McMillan, Tottie Goldsmith and Peter Bensley

The advent of one-day cricket led to the Nine Network moving the show around the schedules. The loss of several popular cast members also contributed to a sharp decline in ratings, and as a consequence of this, the series was moved to a mid-afternoon timeslot and then cancelled in late 1982.

When the series ended after 1397 episodes, it held the record of Australia's longest-running commercial television drama serial. This was later surpassed by A Country Practice and then Neighbours, which is currently the longest-running Australian drama serial. The Young Doctors also holds the distinction, rare among long-running Australian dramas, of having never won any sort of television award.The Young Doctors final episode aired on 30 March 1983 at 14:30, and, coincidentally, The Sullivans had also ended just two weeks earlier.

Stories and settings
Albert Memorial Hospital
Despite the hospital setting, medical procedures rarely featured in storylines, with the majority of the stories and plots focusing more on the personal lives, romances and dramas of the staff. All scenes were played out in the various sets forming the Albert Memorial Hospital. A memorial plaque situated on the wall of the studio set of the hospital's exterior stated the hospital opened in 1889 and it is also established early in the series that the fictional Albert Memorial is located in a Sydney district, with Sydney generically referred to as 'the City'.

A "real life" Albert Memorial Hospital, commonly referred to as the A. M. Hospital was located in Wollongong, and commenced operation in 1864, however closed when the Wollongong Hospital opened in 1907.

The most regularly seen set was the large hospital's entrance lobby containing a reception desk, refreshments kiosk, a lift and stairs to the upper floors, and swinging double-doors that led into the casualty department. Various wards, offices, theatres and small medicine labs all saw an equal amount of romantic and dramatic action over the years. Alan Coleman revealed on a DVD release of the series that the various 'flats' used as sets were simply re-dressed with different hospital equipment and furniture giving the Albert Memorial a sense of monotony often associated with clinical, hospital environments.

Later in The Young Doctors run, location shooting became more frequent and viewers saw more of the hospital's exterior and grounds. Scenes filmed outside the hospital now showed modern, 1960s era buildings, presumably extensions to the original Victorian hospital. Exterior shots were filmed at the real life Royal North Shore Hospital and the former Greenwich Hospital, Sydney, New South Wales, which was used for later exterior shots. There was also a Chapel located in the hospital grounds which was filmed on a few occasions, most notably when Julie Holland was shot at the altar on her Wedding day to Doctor. Russell Edwards. With location shooting so rare, a trip to Melbourne for a travelogue-style Wedding and tour of the city was an extravagant way to celebrate Liz Kennedy's marriage to Doctor John Forrest in 1981.

Bunny's Place
There was also a local bar Bunny's Place which was another venue for the staff to mingle. The bar was originally owned by, and named after, Bunny Howard, played by comedian, Ugly Dave Gray, who was killed off in an early episode. Bunny's Place was said to be situated on the opposite side of the busy main road to the hospital. After Bunny died, Edna Curtis (Vivienne Benson-Young) ran the bar for a while, until Anne-Marie Austin (Judi Connelli) took over a year later. Although the bar's exterior was never shown on-screen, its interior regularly featured in every episode for the duration of the 6 and a half-year series, appearing in both the first and final episodes.

Cast and characters
 Early characters The Young Doctors had a relatively high turnover of young cast playing the doctors and nurses who featured alongside a more stable roster of longer-running elder cast members. The serial also featured many well-known Australian actors appearing in their earliest roles.

Cultural impact

Although The Young Doctors was obviously low-budget and the limitations of the fast-turnaround production schedule sometimes crept into the programme, it was immensely popular during the late 1970s in Australia. One highlight episode of this period was the Wedding Day of Tania (Judy McBurney) to Tony Garcia (Tony Alvarez) in March 1978. The producers splashed out on an OB unit, and a rare church wedding took place with the wedding photos gracing all of the week's TV magazine covers. In a 2006 interview, Judy McBurney, who played Tania, commented; "I thought Young Doctors was a beautiful show. I felt it was innocent, sweet, and a good show...and I think that's why people remember it".

One of the programmes most popular doctors was Ben Fielding, played by Eric Oldfield. He was also Male Model of the Year in 1977 and became the second man to appear naked in a centre spread for Cleo magazine whilst appearing in the show. The actor fondly recalls the photo shoot on a reunion documentary available on both the Umbrella and ViaVision DVD releases, where he describes the pictures as "taboo" because "it wasn't acceptable back then for men to be taking all their clothes off". Oldfield also commented that the pictures have since garnered a popular cult following amongst gay men.

Another notable actor, a very young Russell Crowe, appeared in his first acting role in The Young Doctors. In an episode originally aired in 1977, appropriately, he played a young boy called Russell.

During the 1970s, a number of actors appearing in the show also had singing careers, preempting a similar fad for "singing soap stars" a decade later with another Grundy soap opera, Neighbours. Early episodes featured singers including Jewel Blanch, Mark Hembrow, Bartholomew John, Mark Holden and Judi Connelli. Possibly due to the fast production schedule, and filming six months in advance of transmission dates, contemporary cultural references are rare in The Young Doctors, however, in a very early 1977 episode, Sister Gibbs briskly remarks; "...casualty is busier than an ABBA concert today". The reference to ABBA is likely due to the fact that their 1977 film, Abba: The Movie, was at the same time being produced by Reg Grundy Productions.

Also extremely popular in the United Kingdom, the success of The Young Doctors here is notable because it didn't air in Britain contemporaneously with Australian broadcasts. Most ITV regions did not start showing it until after it had ended in Australia in March 1983. It therefore looked somewhat dated compared with more recent Australian serials that were airing at the same time (namely, Sons and Daughters), nevertheless, it became so popular, a fan club was formed, which was active for several years well into the 1990s.

Awards

Cornelia Frances on the DVD release audio commentary for episode 325 titled, Classic Cliffhangers, that she lost out on the Logie Award for Best Actress for two consecutive years to Lorraine Bayly, who played Grace Sullivan in The Sullivans, which also beat The Young Doctors as Best Drama in 1978, 1979 and 1980.

Regular Cast

There was consistently a core cast of 16 regular characters in The Young Doctors, with all cast members contracted to appear in three out of a block of five episodes each week. Sometimes, a regular character would not be seen on-screen for several weeks and there is an obvious rotation of recurring characters whom came and went as script requirements permitted. More often than not, a departing regular character would simply disappear from the screen, but their presence in the serial would be maintained by regular scripted references to the character being elsewhere in the hospital, or, as Cornelia Frances described it, "stuck in a cupboard for weeks", but, always off screen.

Doctors

Nurses

Hospital Staff

Other cast and characters
 Laura Denham – Joanna Moore•Smith (1976–77) Original cast, recurring 1979-80 'Bunny' Howard – Ugly Dave Gray (1976) Original cast, to episode 43 Edna Curtis – Vivienne Benson-Young (1976–77) Original cast Roger Gordon - Ric Herbert (recurring, 1976–78)
 Frank Curtis - Iain Finlay (1976)
 Toby Denham – Greg Kelly (1976–77)
 Abbie Singleton - Jewel Blanch (1976)
 Maureen Howard - Virginia Rudeno (1976–77)
 Ric Martin – Gerry Sont (1978) 
 Rosalie Parker – Carol Raye (1976–77)
 Arthur Simmonds – Willie Fennell (recurring, 1976–78)
 Dot Warner - Shirley Cameron (1977)
 Russell – Russell Crowe (1977)
 Hilary Templeton – Abigail (1977, 1978)
 Philip Winter – Noel Trevarthen (1977) 
 Georgie Saint – Mark Hembrow (1977, 1979)
 Milt Baxter - Mark Hashfield (1977)
 Sir Thomas Kendall - James Condon (1977)
 Mrs Nielsen - June Salter (1977)
 Irene Hardy - Anne Semler (1977)
 Glenda Stacey - Julieanne Newbould (1977)
 Ben Stone - John Jarratt (1977)
 Anne-Marie Austin – Judi Connelli (1977–78)
 Sandy Pearce – Anna Hruby (1977–78)
 Rene Brooks – Moya O'Sullivan (1977)
 Clarrie Baker - Tony Adams (1977)
 Vicky Clayton - Bronwen Samuel (1977)
 Cora Clayton - Tina Grenville (1977)
 Erika Hoffman – Karen Petersen (1978–1980)
 Amelia Frost – Enid Lorimer (1978)
 Roxanne Moore - Harriet Littlesmith (1978)
 Moira Callaghan – Hilda Scurr (1978)
 Edward Gordon – Brian Harrison (1978–9)
 Deirdre Snape - Elizabeth Kemp (1979)
 Kevin McAllister – Vincent Ball (1979)
 David McAllister – Simon Burke 1979
 Roland Perry – Wallas Eaton (1979–80)
 Lois Norton – Penne Hackforth-Jones (1979)
 Mrs Newman – June Collis (1979, 1981)
 Ken Hansen – Joe Hasham (1979)
 Steve Newman – Kit Taylor (1979, 1981–2)
 Sylvia Marcus – Carmen Duncan (1979)
 Sophie Bertram – Betty Lucas (1979)
 Douglas Kennedy – Bill Kerr (1980)
 Rachel Thorpe – Ros Wood (1980)
 Hazel Kennedy – Jessica Noad (1980)
 Arthur Shepherd – Ron Shand (1981)
 Pippa Blake – Benita Collings (1982)
 Mrs Wilson – Mary Ward (1982)

International success
The relatively long-running serial also achieved modest international cult success, particularly in the United Kingdom, where it was broadcast on the ITV network. It also aired in New Zealand, France and Spain.

UK broadcasts

In the United Kingdom the programme was acquired by 13 of the 14 weekday members of the ITV Network. Scottish Television never purchased the series, although Grampian Television and Border Television did. Most of the ITV regions screened The Young Doctors at their own regional pace, starting in January 1982.
 Central Television pioneered the programme in a Tuesday and Thursday 12:30 slot from Tuesday, 19 January 1982, but during the year, moved to Monday and Tuesdays at 15:45, sharing the slot with the then seasonal Scottish soap opera, Take the High Road, which had started in 1980. In January 1983, episodes increased to daily at 15:30 until Sons and Daughters  began in February. These two serials then shared this timeslot for well over four years, with The Young Doctors always airing on Mondays and Tuesdays. This continued until September 1987 when a revamp of ITV's daytime schedule saw Central return the programme to 12:00 noon, and then 12:35, thus allowing both The Young Doctors and Sons and Daughters to increase to four or five episodes a week in their revised respective slots. Following the end of Sons and Daughters in December 1988, The Young Doctors returned to 15:30 during Christmas week, and usually aired Tuesday to Friday until Families began in April 1990, which took the Monday and Tuesday 15:30 slot. The Young Doctors was finally moved to 14:50-15:20, Monday to Thursday later in 1990, and finished Tuesday, 18 August 1992, the first ITV region to complete all of the series.
 HTV started the series on Tuesday, 4 January 1983 and continued regularly twice weekly. Initially broadcast Mondays and Fridays at 17:15-17:45, it was soon moved to 15:30-16:00 on Mondays and Tuesdays and finished on 18 April 1994.
 Granada Television and Border Television both broadcast daily episodes five days a week from September 1983. From January 1984 this was reduced to three weekly episodes, Wednesday to Friday where it remained until the Wednesday episode was dropped in October 1989. During the month of August on some years Granada and Border would pause the series for the summer month. Both regions overtook Central for several years, however, they ultimately finished the series after Central at Easter 1993 at 15:20.
 Anglia Television started on 3 September 1984, going out Mondays and Tuesdays at 15:30 until 17 April 1990; then changed to Wednesdays and Thursdays from 25 April 1990. It was then moved to Thursdays and Fridays from Friday 6 July 1990 and an additional Wednesday episode returns in January 1991. Then Mondays to Fridays from January 1992 and finally, Thursdays and Fridays at 13:55 until Friday, 2 June 1995.
 Thames Television and LWT in London started screening the series initially at 17:15 on Thursdays and Fridays from 23 June 1983 until 1 September 1984, before switching the series to 15:30 slot, to allow Blockbusters the slot. From this point onwards, only Thames broadcast the series. When Carlton Television took over in January 1993, the series was dropped for 6 months to allow backlog of Blockbusters episodes to be aired, The Young Doctors returned daily on 7 June 1993 concluding the programme as an 80minute special from 13:55 on Friday 30 December 1994. 
 Grampian Television started on Monday, 14 November 1983, increased to 4 episode per week by 1991, and finished Friday, 30 September 1994.
 Television South (TVS) started on Monday 9 April 1984 broadcasting Mondays and Tuesdays 15:30; In May switched; Mondays to Wednesdays 17:15 for summer 1984; then Thursdays and Fridays 15:30 from early September 1984; then Mondays to Wednesdays from January 1985 until Wednesday 2 September 1987; then Wednesdays and Thursdays at 12:00 noon; then Mondays, Wednesdays and Fridays used from 4 January 1988 15.30; then Tuesdays, Wednesdays and Thursdays from 25 April 1990. TVS lost their franchise at the end of 1992 but their successor, Meridian Television continued to show the series (more information on the timeslot required) and completed the run on 8 July 1993.
 Tyne Tees Television began the series Monday, 1 October 1984 and aired Mondays and Tuesdays 15:30 until 17 April 1990. It was then moved to Tuesdays and Wednesdays at 14:00 from 25 April 1990. From Thursday, 3 January 1991 moves to 15:20 Thursdays and Fridays. A Wednesday episode was added from 23 January 1991, and then from January 1992, it is broadcast Mondays to Fridays at 15:20. From Monday 4 January 1993 Tyne Tees and Yorkshire screened the programme daily at 15:20. From January 1994 until the end in December of that year, this changed to Monday – Thursday at 14.50. 
 TSW Started the series on 1 April 1985, Monday and Fridays at 17:15 until 8 July, when it was moved to 15.30 slot. On 17 October 1988, the series moves to 12:30 on Mondays and Wednesdays but due to TSW choosing to screen the daily afternoon repeat of Home and Away at 15:25 this resulted in the series becoming weekly during 1989/1990 at 13:30 however returned to twice a week by the end of 1990. Westcountry Television took over in 1993, and continued twice a week until early 1994 when it was increased to three times a week until 20 December 1995 when episode 1101 was broadcast. The series was not completed.
 Years after most of the other regions Yorkshire Television started the series in June 1988, going out five times a week at 12:30, reducing to three times a week from January 1989. In September 1989 the series moved to 15:25 daily with the Wednesday episode dropped from October. In April 1990, the series output is further reduced to two episodes a week on Thursdays and Fridays before the resumption of the Wednesday episode in early 1991. During 1992 the series fluctuates between three, four and five episodes a week ending the year on episode 764. In January 1993, they had to skip 215 episodes to enable them to catch up to Tyne Tees Television, as from January 1993, both regions screened exactly the same material. It aired daily at 15:20, until January 1994 when the Friday episode was dropped until the series ended on Thursday 15 December 1994.
 The Young Doctors was also aired on Sky Channel. On Monday, 6 February 1989, the first episode was broadcast 17:00–17:30. From 6 July 1989, it was moved to 15.15–15.45 (to make way for Sky Star Search which took the 17:00–18:00 slot). 256 episodes were broadcast in these slots.

In February 1990, now called Sky One, the channel dropped another Australian soap, The Sullivans, from their mid-morning schedule, so from 5 February 1990, The Young Doctors rewound back to the first episode (due to almost catching up with some ITV regions, and having overtaken ITV Yorkshire), and it was aired now 10:30-11:00. Sky One eventually cancelled The Young Doctors just over two years later, at episode 589, which aired Friday, 29 May 1992.

New Zealand broadcasts
In New Zealand The Young Doctors was aired on TV2. On Monday, 22 February 1982, the first episode was broadcast at 5.30pm. From 19 July 1982, it was moved to the 6pm slot. To make way for Sons and Daughters, the series was moved from 6pm to a 'double episode' format at 6.30pm on a Tuesday and Wednesday evening from 11 February 1986. It reverted to half hour, weekday episodes in the 5.15pm slot from 4 August until 12 December 1986, and then to double episodes in the 5.05-5.55pm slot from 15 December 1986 until 6 February 1987. From 9 February 1987, the series was moved to TV One and reverted to half hour episodes at 5.15pm. The final episode was broadcast on Wednesday 27 May 1987.

Remake
In November 2007, the Nine Network announced plans to remake the series in conjunction with FremantleMedia. Originally, it was set to be broadcast in 2008 but due to script delays, the premiere date had been pushed back to 2009. The remake was set to be named Young Doctors'' (minus "The"). However, at the end of 2008, the Nine Network officially passed on the idea. The network decided against the remake, instead, confirming a second series of the popular Australian drama Underbelly. FremantleMedia is currently searching for another television station to contract the programme.

Home media
Selected episodes of the serial were released on DVD in October 2006, under the title of The Best Romances. A second set of selected episodes, under the title of Classic Cliffhangers, was released in February 2008. In 1994, prior to the DVDs, a VHS was edited in the UK by "NTV entertainment" collecting episodes A, B (pilots) & 1.

On 16 June 2021, ViaVision Entertainment released the first 250 episodes of the series in a 35 disc set which consisted of all episodes screened in 1976 and 1977.

References

External links

Aussie Soap Archive: The Young Doctors — Overview and Review
Documentary celebrating 30 year anniversary, with cast interviews
The Young Doctors at the National Film and Sound Archive

Australian television soap operas
Australian medical television series
Nine Network original programming
Television series produced by The Reg Grundy Organisation
1976 Australian television series debuts
1983 Australian television series endings
Television shows set in Sydney
English-language television shows